After losing re-election to Republican Benjamin Harrison in 1888 and leaving office in 1889, U.S. President Grover Cleveland was initially satisfied with his return to private life. However, Cleveland's views about his retirement began to change at the time of the 1890 midterm elections, in which the Democrats won huge victories at the ballot box. In addition, Cleveland disliked what he perceived to be the frequent blunders of the Harrison administration. By the time 1891 ended, Grover Cleveland decided to re-enter American political life and run again for U.S. president in the 1892 U.S. presidential election.

Democratic nomination

The main reasons for Cleveland's return into politics were his desire to prevent New York Governor David B. Hill (a political rival of Cleveland's who also wanted the 1892 Democratic nomination) from winning the Democratic presidential nomination that year and Cleveland's staunch opposition to free silver, a prominent political issue back then. Cleveland considered Governor Hill to be a corrupt machine boss, and he staunchly believed that the Democrats should maintain their support of the gold standard. Cleveland hired former U.S. Navy Secretary William C. Whitney as his campaign manager that year. Cleveland and Whitney frequently contacted Southern politicians and newspaper editors in an attempt to get them to support Cleveland's 1892 Presidential bid. Cleveland portrayed himself as a candidate who could unify the Democratic Party (due to his status as a former president and the only Democrat elected U.S. president since the U.S. Civil War) and tried appealing to Southerners by opposing federal oversight of African American voting rights. Whitney also fundraised huge amounts of cash from wealthy bankers and businessmen in order to finance Cleveland's presidential campaign. An attempt by New York Democratic Party chairman Edward Murphy to strengthen Governor Hill's chances for the 1892 Democratic nomination by giving him all of New York's delegates backfired and ended up helping Cleveland (since most of the delegates from the other states ended up supporting him afterwards). When the 1892 Democratic National Convention convened on June 21, 1892, in Chicago, Cleveland was narrowly able to win the Democratic party nomination for U.S. president on the first ballot. Specifically, on the first ballot of the convention, Cleveland gained 617 1/3 votes, just ten more votes than the necessary two-thirds majority.

General election

Not counting the anomalous 1912 election, the 1892 U.S. presidential election was the first and only U.S. presidential election where both an incumbent U.S. president and an ex-U.S. President both ran as the major party nominees. With the exception of the new pro-free silver Populist Party and its candidate James B. Weaver, the 1892 election was a rematch of the 1888 election, since Cleveland and Harrison competed against each other for the U.S. presidency back then as well. Cleveland ran on a platform of lowering tariffs (especially the McKinley Tariff), supporting the gold standard (something which he made his VP nominee Adlai Stevenson do as well) and on opposing the Republican-backed Force Bill. In addition, the Democrats criticized the Republicans for causing the Homestead Strike to occur due to their protectionist policies. Breaking tradition, Cleveland delivered his acceptance speech for the Democratic nomination in front of 20,000 supporters at New York City’s Madison Square Garden. Cleveland did not actively campaign much (partially due to U.S. First Lady Caroline Harrison's battle with tuberculosis throughout the 1892 campaign season), but his vice presidential nominee Adlai Stevenson of Illinois heavily campaigned for the Democratic ticket. Cleveland's campaign did spend nearly $2,350,000 (or $46,300,000 in 2002 dollars) on his campaign, a greater amount than incumbent Republican U.S. President Benjamin Harrison spent on his re-election campaign. Whitney (Cleveland's campaign manager) eventually managed to get New York Governor David B. Hill and the Tammany Hall political machine to reluctantly support Cleveland in 1892, which might have helped Cleveland narrowly win his home state of New York. Grover Cleveland won the general election by the largest popular vote margin (three percent) in twenty years. In addition, Cleveland won almost two thirds of the Electoral College vote, winning all of the states that he won in 1884 in addition to Illinois, Wisconsin, and California. Due to winning in 1892, Grover Cleveland became the first (and to this date only) ex-U.S. President to be elected U.S. president again.

See also
Grover Cleveland 1884 presidential campaign
Grover Cleveland 1888 presidential campaign

References

1892 United States presidential election
Presidential campaign
Democratic Party (United States) presidential campaigns